Andre F. Baker Jr. is an American politician and businessman serving as a member of the Connecticut House of Representatives from the 124th district. He assumed office on January 7, 2015.

Early life and education 
Baker was born and raised in New Rochelle, New York. He earned an Associate of Science degree in mortuary science from Farmingdale State College in 1986.

Career 
Baker is the owner and CEO of Baker-Isaac Funeral Services in Bridgeport, Connecticut and Baker Funeral Services in South Norwalk, Connecticut. He was also a member of the Bridgeport Common Council for eight years and the Bridgeport Board of Education for two years. Baker was elected to the Connecticut House of Representatives in November 2014 and assumed office on January 7, 2015. During the 2019–2020 legislative session, Baker served as vice chair of the House Planning and Development Committee.

References 

Living people
People from New Rochelle, New York
Democratic Party members of the Connecticut House of Representatives
Farmingdale State College alumni
African-American state legislators in Connecticut
People from Bridgeport, Connecticut
21st-century American politicians
Year of birth missing (living people)
21st-century African-American politicians